Pimeno-Cherni is a rural locality (a khutor) and the administrative center of Pimeno-Chernyanskoye Rural Settlement, Kotelnikovsky District, Volgograd Oblast, Russia. The population was 1,088 as of 2010. There are 27 streets.

Geography 
Pimeno-Cherni is located on the right bank of the Aksay Kurmoyarsky River, 32 km northeast of Kotelnikovo (the district's administrative centre) by road. Nizhniye Cherni is the nearest rural locality.

References 

Rural localities in Kotelnikovsky District